The 2010 Insight Bowl was the 22nd edition of the college football bowl game, played at Sun Devil Stadium in Tempe, Arizona on Tuesday, December 28, 2010. It featured the Missouri Tigers from the Big 12 Conference versus the Iowa Hawkeyes from the Big Ten Conference.

Teams
This was the first meeting of the teams since 1910, when Missouri refused to take the field if Archie Alexander, the black starting tackle for Iowa travelled to Columbia. Prior to this game, Iowa and Missouri had previously met 12 times, all coming between 1892 and 1910, with Missouri holding a 7–5 lead in the series.

Missouri

The Tigers entered the bowl with a 10–2 record.  Midway through the season, Missouri looked like it might be making a beeline for the BCS, sitting at 7–0 and favored in its final four games. The Tigers stumbled, following a loss to Nebraska with another at Texas Tech, but rebounded to win its final three games and finish at 10–2 for the program's third 10-win season in four years, bringing the program to its fourth such season ever.  Much to the disappointment to many fans, Missouri would later make their second appearance in the Insight Bowl.  They were a 34–31 winner over West Virginia in the 1998 game.

Iowa

Iowa looked to end its season on a high note in making its first appearance at the Insight Bowl.  The Hawkeyes started off the season with a No. 9 ranking in the preseason AP poll. They had dominating wins over No. 22 Penn State and No. 5 Michigan State – the Spartans only loss in the regular season.  But Iowa lost 4 of their last 6 regular season games by a total of 11 points, including a season-ending 27–24 loss at 2–9 Minnesota.  The Hawkeyes won their previous two bowl games and were coming off with a 24–14 win in the Orange Bowl over Georgia Tech, giving the Hawkeyes their first BCS bowl win in school history.

Weather
57 deg (F), wind: W at 3 mph, 47% humidity

Game summary

Scoring

Team statistics
Statistics

Notes
Iowa and Missouri had previously played each other 12 times with Missouri holding a 7–5 advantage. However, the most recent previous time that the schools had met was in 1910. The two squads had never faced each other in a bowl game.

References

Insight Bowl
Guaranteed Rate Bowl
Iowa Hawkeyes football bowl games
Missouri Tigers football bowl games
Sports in Tempe, Arizona
Insight Bowl
Sports competitions in Maricopa County, Arizona